Maju Varghese (born February 21, 1978) is an American attorney and political advisor who served as director of the White House Military Office in the Biden administration. He assumed office in March 9, 2021 and left office January 21, 2022.

Early life and education 
Varghese was born in New York City and raised in Elmont, the son of parents who immigrated from Kerala, India. Varghese's mother worked as a nurse while his father was a cab driver in New York City. After graduating from Elmont Memorial Junior – Senior High School, Varghese earned a Bachelor of Arts degree in political science and economics from the University of Massachusetts Amherst and a Juris Doctor from the Maurice A. Deane School of Law of Hofstra University.

Career 
In 1999 and 2000, Varghese worked on the advance team for the Al Gore 2000 presidential campaign. He then worked as a research associate for the Democratic National Committee. From 2006 to 2010, he was a legal associate at Wade Clark Mulcahy LLP in New York City, where he specialized in civil litigation, construction accidents, and property damage claims. In 2010, Varghese joined the White House Office, serving as advance lead, special assistant to President Barack Obama and director of advance, and assistant to the president for management and administration. In 2017 and 2018, Varghese was a senior advisor at Dentons. He was then the COO of The Hub Project, a left-wing advocacy and research firm that provides campaign services to progressive political candidates.

From September 2019 to November 2020, Varghese was a senior advisor and the COO of the Joe Biden 2020 presidential campaign. Varghese acted as the executive director of the 59th Presidential Inaugural Committee and was later appointed as director of the White House Military Office in the Biden administration. Varghese ended his term as WHMO Director on January 21, 2022.

References 

Living people
People from New York City
People from Elmont, New York
University of Massachusetts Amherst alumni
Maurice A. Deane School of Law alumni
Hofstra University alumni
Obama administration personnel
Biden administration personnel
1978 births